Grinnell Falls is a waterfall in Glacier National Park, Montana, US. The falls are in the Many Glacier region of the park, between Mount Grinnell and Angel Wing.

References

Landforms of Glacier County, Montana
Landforms of Glacier National Park (U.S.)
Waterfalls of Glacier National Park (U.S.)